Uritsky Street is a south-north street in Zheleznodorozhny City District of Novosibirsk, Russia. It starts from Kommunisticheskaya Street, crosses Oktyabrskaya, Chaplygin, Gorky and Lenin streets and then forms an intersection with Vokzalnaya Magistral.

Architecture
 Women's Gimnasium of P. A. Smirnova is a building on the corner of Uritsky and Lenin streets. It was built in 1905.
 Uritsky Street 34 is a residential building built in 1927. Architect: I. A. Burlakov.
 Gosbank Employees Residential Building is a building constructed in 1932–1935. Architect: Andrey Kryachkov.
 Uritsky Street 17 is a building built in the 1930s. The architectural style of the building is a symbiosis of constructivism and Soviet classicism. Architect: A. N. Shiryaiev.
 West Siberian Railway Building is a building on the corner of Vokzalnaya Magistral and Uritsky Street. It was built in 1935. Architects: Vengerov and A. N. Shiryaiev.
 Tomsk Railway Residential Building is a building built in 1935. Architect: A. N. Shiryayev.
 Uritsky Street 35 is a residential building constructed in the second half of the 1930s. Architect: A. I. Loscutov.

Demolished buildings
 Surikov House is a building built in 1897. It was located on the corner of Uritsky and Deputatskaya streets. The building was demolished in the early 2000s.

Gallery

Facts
American architect Michael Mehaffy described the street as a street properly and conveniently organized for people.

References

Tsentralny City District, Novosibirsk
Zheleznodorozhny City District, Novosibirsk
Streets in Novosibirsk